The Ingham County Courthouse is an historic government building located at 315 South Jefferson Street in Mason, Ingham County, Michigan. It occupies an entire city block bounded by South Jefferson, East Ash, South Barnes and East Maple Street. Constructed from 1902 to 1904, it is Ingham County's third courthouse and the second on this block, which is directly north of the site of the first courthouse. Designed by noted Lansing architect Edwyn A. Bowd in the Beaux Arts style of architecture, it was built by George W. Rickman and Sons Company of Kalamazoo.

The Ingham County Courthouse was listed on the Michigan Register of Historic Places on May 18, 1971 and was listed on the National Register of Historic Places on December 13, 1971.

Today building is still used as the Ingham County Courthouse, although much of its original functions are conducted at the Veterans Memorial Courthouse at 313 West Kalamazoo Street and at other locations in Lansing, the county's largest city as well as the capital of Michigan.

In the news
Famous trials, real or fictional, which have taken place here include:

 1969: The Algiers Motel incident murder trial of Detroit police officer Ronald August was moved to the Ingham County Courthouse from Wayne County after the publication of John Hersey's 1968 book on the incident.
 2011: The courthouse scenes of the film Real Steel starring Hugh Jackman were taken at the Ingham County Courthouse.

Gallery

References

External links

 Ingham County official website

Courthouses on the National Register of Historic Places in Michigan
Michigan State Historic Sites in Ingham County
Beaux-Arts architecture in Michigan
County courthouses in Michigan
Government buildings completed in 1904
Buildings and structures in Ingham County, Michigan
National Register of Historic Places in Ingham County, Michigan
1904 establishments in Michigan